Jesse Samuel  Shatkin (born 1979) is an American songwriter, producer and engineer. He has worked with Sia, Kelly Clarkson, Jennifer Lopez, Fitz and the Tantrums, One Direction, and Miley Cyrus, among others. Shatkin was nominated in 2014 for Grammy Awards as both a producer (Record of the Year) and as a songwriter (Song of the Year). Both nominations were based on his work on the Sia track "Chandelier", which he co-wrote and co-produced. He was also nominated in the Record of the Year category in 2013 as an engineer on Clarkson's single "Stronger (What Doesn't Kill You)".

Shatkin works frequently with producer Greg Kurstin. As an engineer, his credits include records by artists including Jennifer Lopez, Selena Gomez, Ellie Goulding, Pink, Rita Ora, The Shins, Lily Allen, Tegan and Sara and Dido, among others.

Songwriting and production credits

References

External links
 Official website  

1979 births
Living people
American record producers
American male songwriters